Entering the Arena is the third album by the German industrial/EBM band Die Krupps.

Track listing
 "Risk" - 3:54
 "Rise and Fall" - 5:32
 "Communication Breakdown" - 3:02
 "Risky Soul Version" - 6:34
 "Gladiators" - 5:26
 "Your Voice" - 5:38
 "Communication Breakdown" (Don't Speak Mix) - 3:12
 "This Day Is Not the Last" - 3:55
 "Risk" (Operatic Intro) - 3:52
 "Risk" (Metallic Outro) - 3:17

Credits
 Jürgen Engler - guitars, vocals
 Christina Schnekenbuger - vocals
 Christopher Lietz - vocals
 Walter Jaeger - ?
 Mel Gaynor - drums, percussion

1985 albums
Die Krupps albums
Virgin Records albums